Shane Sweetnam (born 19 January 1981) is an Irish equestrian. He competed in the 2020 Summer Olympics.

References

External links
 
 
 

1981 births
Living people
Sportspeople from Cork (city)
People from Wellington, Florida
Equestrians at the 2020 Summer Olympics
Irish male equestrians
Olympic equestrians of Ireland
Show jumping riders